Judolia antecurrens is an extinct species of beetle in the family Cerambycidae. It was described by Wickham in 1913.

References

A
Beetles described in 1913